"Boogie Oogie Oogie" is a song by the American band A Taste of Honey from their 1978 self-titled debut album. Released as their debut single in the summer of 1978, the song became an extremely popular "crossover" disco song. It topped the American pop, soul and disco charts, and it became the first certified platinum single in the history of Capitol Records for selling over two million copies. It also became one of the most recognizable songs from the disco era. The lyrics beseech listeners to "boogie oogie oogie, till you just can't boogie no more".

The group was awarded two platinum records for the single and the album, and they won the Grammy Award for Best New Artist at the 20th Grammys on February 15, 1979.

Limited edition colored vinyl releases were issued in some nations.  In Mexico, the record was red, and in France it was honey colored.

In popular culture
The song was used in the films At Close Range, Barcelona, The Watermelon Woman, Contact, Breast Men, The Big Heist, Mystery Men, Screwed, Canvas, Film Stars Don't Die in Liverpool, and The Nice Guys. It is also featured in the video games Grand Theft Auto IV: The Ballad of Gay Tony and Boogie.

Track listing
7" vinyl single

 "Boogie Oogie Oogie" – 3:45
 "World Spin" – 3:50

Charts

Weekly charts

Year-end charts

All-time charts

References

External links
[ Song review]

1978 songs
1978 singles
A Taste of Honey (band) songs
GQ (band) songs
Billboard Hot 100 number-one singles
Cashbox number-one singles
Disco songs
Funk songs
Capitol Records singles
Song recordings produced by Mizell Brothers